Associazione Sportiva Dilettantistica Victor San Marino, better known as Victor San Marino, is a Sammarinese professional association football club based in the city of Acquaviva, that competes in the Eccellenza, the fifth tier of Italian football.

Founded in 1959 and re-founded in 1973 and again in 2000, it is the only football club based in the Republic of San Marino authorized by the FIGC to compete in the Italian football league The club colours are sky blue and white, reminiscent of the Sammarinese flag.

Historically, the highest level reached by the club was the Italian third tier, with a highest finish of tenth place. This makes it therefore the only Sanmarinese football team to have played in a professional league, as the national tournament of San Marino is amateur-level. Since the club is a full member of the Italian league system, it would hypothetically represent Italy in continental competitions, rather than its home country.

On 4 July 2019 the sports title of the San Marino Calcio is transferred to the Cattolica Calcio, which takes the name of "Cattolica Calcio San Marino" and which is admitted to the Serie D championship. The company retained its legal and administrative headquarters in the Republic of San Marino, but sporting activity took place in Cattolica and the colors become yellow and red. In 2021, the team was refounded to represent San Marino in the Italian league system.

The original club was founded in 1960 as S.S. Serenissima (Società Sportiva Serenissima). Serenissima merged with S.S. Juvenes in 1973, changing its name to A.C. San Marino (Associazione Calcio San Marino) and in 1988–89 to its final name, San Marino Calcio.

History 
The club was founded as Società Sportiva Serenissima in 1960 by the San Marino Football Federation, in order to have a team representing the Republic of San Marino in the Italian league. The club was later purchased by Sammarinese and Italian entrepreneurs.

The foundation year is still disputed, mainly due to another team sponsored (but not owned) by the San Marino Football Federation, called Libertas-Tre Penne, having taken part in the Italian championship in 1959. The crest of Tre Penne is still visible on that of San Marino Calcio. Serenissima also inherited Libertas-Tre Penne's colors.

San Marino Calcio is the only professional football team in the Republic of San Marino that is allowed to play exclusively in the Italian football league system. Since the San Marino Football League is completely amateur, the club is also the only professional team in the Republic. Another team from San Marino, A.C. Juvenes/Dogana, competed in both the amateur levels of Italian football and in the Sammarinese league in the past, but has since withdrawn from the FIGC.

Early years 
A.C. San Marino began playing in 1960 in the Seconda Categoria, since the Terza Categoria did not exist in the Italian football league system at that time. After being promoted from the Seconda and Prima Categoria, the team began playing in the higher level, the Promozione before being relegated to the Prima Categoria in the 1976–77 season. They continued to play in the Prima Categoria for the next four seasons until they won the championship and were promoted to the Promozione again in the 1979–80 season. A.C. San Marino's stay in the Promozione was short lived, however; within two seasons they were relegated to the Prima Categoria.

The team established themselves as a yo-yo club as they were once again promoted to the Promozione as champions in the 1984–85 season. The team then saw back-to-back championships as they won the Promozione the following season, and were promoted for the first time to the Serie D, the highest amateur league in Italy. San Marino's success continued as they finished in second place in Serie D in the 1986–87 season, a championship they went on to win in the following year. In the 1988–89 season, the team appeared in the lowest level of the Italian professional league (Serie C2) for the first time.

In 1988 A.C. San Marino became a joint stock company and changed its name from A.C. San Marino to San Marino Calcio. The renamed team was relegated to Serie D in the 1989–90 season after finishing second-last in Serie C2. After finishing 17th in the 1991–92 season San Marino Calcio were relegated again, this time to the Eccellenza, but were again promoted to Serie D in the 1992–93 season. In the 1995–96 season San Marino Calcio were relegated to the Eccellenza again after a three-year stay in Serie D, but they were again promoted in the 1996–97 season.

The club's success was due in part to the appointment of the San Marino national football team manager Giampaolo Mazza, who led them to two non-consecutive Eccellenza championships. In the 1999–2000 season San Marino Calcio were promoted to the Serie C2 as champions of Serie D.

Post millennium 
San Marino Calcio began the new millennium in the fourth level of Italian professional football, receiving a major boost with the arrival of the legendary San Marino international Andy Selva. Napoli (old Napoli which bankrupted in 2004) also takeover the club as investor in 2000 but re-sold in November 2002. San Marino Calcio consolidated their place in Serie C2 by finishing in the top half of the league standings for the next three seasons. The team was able to reach the 2003–04 play-off final, but was defeated, and remained in Serie C2 after finishing fourth in the league. San Marino Calcio's 2004–05 season was more successful: they were victorious in the play-off final, and thus reached Lega Pro Prima Divisione (formerly Serie C1) for the first time. The team was relegated again to Lega Pro Seconda Divisione during the 2006–07 season.

In December 2006 Werther Cornieti, the chairman of the club, left due to controversial allegations and criticism during a sports broadcast. Daniele De Luigi was later confirmed as the new chairman of San Marino Calcio.

In the season 2011–12 it was promoted from Lega Pro Seconda Divisione to Lega Pro Prima Divisione. The club stayed at that level for three seasons, but got relegated to Serie D after a last place finish in the 2014–15 season.

Colours and badge 

The club's home kit consists of a light blue shirt with white and black inserts, black shorts, and black socks.
Their away kit consists of a white shirt with dark blue inserts, white shorts, and black socks.
San Marino Calcio released a third kit for merchandising, which consists of a red shirt with dark blue inserts, red shorts, and red socks.

The golden frame of their badge contains the team name and the phrase "Titanus aggressurus Olympum", which refers to the Titans in Greek mythology. Pictured in the center of the badge is a Titan. In Italian, the word "Titan" signifies both the race of mythological gods and Monte Titano, the highest point in San Marino. The left-hand circle represents the badge of Tre Penne, one of San Marino Calcio's two founding teams, and the right-hand circle represents the old San Marino Calcio badge.

Home stadium

Stadio Olimpico

The Olympic Stadium was the home of San Marino Calcio (currently Victor San Marino) until 2019. The stadium is located in Serravalle and was constructed in 1969. It is also home to the San Marino national football team and, in the past, to the Serravalle-based football club A.C. Juvenes/Dogana. The Olympic Stadium is an all-seater stadium and has a capacity of 6,664.

Stadio di Acquaviva

Roster 
Source:

Honours 
As of 8 May 2012.
Serie C2
Champions:
Runner-up: 2011–12
Promoted by Play–offs 1: 2004–05 (it)

Lega Pro Seconda Divisione
Champions:
Runners-up 1: 2011–12 (promoted)
Promoted by Play–offs:

Serie D
Champions 2: 1987–88 (it), 1999–2000 (it)
Runners-up 1: 1986–87 (it)

Eccellenza Emilia-Romagna
Champions 2: 1992–93 (it), 1996–1997 (it)

Promozione Emilia-Romagna
Champions 1: 1985–86 (it)

Prima Categoria
Champions 2: 1979–80, 1984–85

References

External links 
  Official site of San Marino Calcio

 
Serravalle (San Marino)
Association football clubs established in 1960
Football clubs in Italy
Football clubs in San Marino
Serie C clubs
Expatriated football clubs
1960 establishments in San Marino